Perumapperuma Arachchige Kaveesha Praveen Jayawickrama (born 30 September 1998), normally known as Praveen Jayawickrama, is a professional Sri Lankan cricketer who plays for the national team in all three formats. He made his international debut for the Sri Lanka cricket team in April 2021. He had his education in St. Sebastian's College, Moratuwa. and Holy Cross College, Kaluthara.

Domestic career
He made his first-class debut for Colts Cricket Club in the 2018–19 Premier League Tournament on 11 January 2019. Prior to his first-class debut, he was named in Sri Lanka's squad for the 2018 Under-19 Cricket World Cup. He made his List A debut on 15 December 2019, for Moors Sports Club in the 2019–20 Invitation Limited Over Tournament. He made his Twenty20 debut on 4 January 2020, for Moors Sports Club in the 2019–20 SLC Twenty20 Tournament.

In August 2021, he was named in the SLC Blues team for the 2021 SLC Invitational T20 League tournament. In July 2022, he was signed by the Jaffna Kings for the third edition of the Lanka Premier League.

International career
In April 2021, Jayawickrama was named in Sri Lanka's Test squad for their series against Bangladesh. He made his Test debut on 29 April 2021, for Sri Lanka against Bangladesh. On his debut, he took six wickets for 92 runs in the first innings, to become the fifth bowler for Sri Lanka to take a five-wicket haul on debut in a Test match. He also took five wickets for 86 runs in the second innings, becoming the first bowler for Sri Lanka, and 16th overall, to take a ten-wicket haul on debut in a Test match. It was the best bowling performance by a left-arm spinner on debut in Test cricket, and the first bowler to take a 10-wicket haul on debut since Jason Krejza in 2008.

In June 2021, Jayawickrama was named in Sri Lanka's squad for their series against England. He made his One Day International (ODI) debut on 29 June 2021, for Sri Lanka against England. In July 2021, he was named in Sri Lanka's squad for their series against India. In August 2021, he was named in Sri Lanka's Twenty20 International (T20I) squad for their series against South Africa.

In September 2021, Jayawickrama was named in Sri Lanka's squad for the 2021 ICC Men's T20 World Cup. He made his T20I debut on 12 September 2021, for Sri Lanka against South Africa.

References

External links

1998 births
Living people
Sri Lankan cricketers
Sri Lanka Test cricketers
Sri Lanka One Day International cricketers
Sri Lanka Twenty20 International cricketers
Colts Cricket Club cricketers
Moors Sports Club cricketers
Place of birth missing (living people)
Cricketers who have taken five wickets on Test debut